Evermay is a historic Federal architecture-style house at 1623 28th Street, Northwest, Washington, D.C., in the Georgetown neighborhood. The property originally extended south to Q Street, but the other houses were divided from the property.

History
In 1792-1794 Samuel Davidson bought a portion of the 795-acre tract called the "Rock of Dumbarton" from Thomas Beall. Davidson was one of the owners of the land on which the White House and the National Mall are currently located.

The house was built in 1801 at a cost of $2,302.82 with proceeds from the sale of the White House land to the Federal government of the United States. It was designed by British architect Nicholas King, the first surveyor of Washington, D.C. and founder of its first library.

The house underwent interior renovations until 1818.

Davidson was not married and had no children and upon his death, his nephew, Lewis Grant, inherited the property. Lewis Grant's daughter married Charles Dodge.

In 1877, the Dodges sold the property to John D. McPherson. McPherson added a porch and converted the house to the Victorian architecture style.

Henry Hayes Lockwood lived at the property and died there in 1899.

In 1919, developer Francis H. Duehey bought the property and planned to demolish the house and build a hotel on the site. The citizens of Georgetown rallied to pass an ordinance forbidding construction taller than 40 feet.

Diplomat F. Lammot Belin and his wife bought the property in 1924. Belin came from a family of French immigrants who married into the du Pont family and made a fortune in the gunpowder industry.

As part of extensive renovations and enlargements, he removed Victorian elements at the house to restore its Georgian simplicity. He owned the property until his death in 1961, when it was inherited by his son, Peter Belin.

In 1961, Peter added the brick orangery on the east front.

In 1973, Evermay was added to the National Register of Historic Places.

In 1996, the house was inherited by Peter's son, Harry Belin.

In 1999, Harry formed the Evermay Society and began renting the estate for corporate events, weddings, anniversary parties, even fundraisers for President George W. Bush, all for tens of thousands of dollars apiece. He also let nonprofits such as Bible study groups, local preservation groups, human rights advocates and environmentalists use Evermay for free.

Harry was unable to afford the annual property taxes of $100,000 and annual upkeep costs of $200,000 and sold the house in May 2011 for $22 million to Dr. Sachiko Kuno and Dr. Ryuji Ueno, founders of Sucampo Pharmaceuticals. The couple also own Halcyon House, another historic Georgetown mansion. The houses are now used by their nonprofit organization.

References

Houses completed in 1801
Houses on the National Register of Historic Places in Washington, D.C.
Federal architecture in Washington, D.C.
Individually listed contributing properties to historic districts on the National Register in Washington, D.C.
Georgetown (Washington, D.C.)